Delta-like 3 (Drosophila), also known as DLL3, is a protein which in humans is encoded by the DLL3 gene. Two transcript variants encoding distinct isoforms have been identified for this gene.

Function 

This gene encodes a member of the delta protein ligand family. This family functions as Notch ligands that are characterized by a DSL domain, EGF repeats, and a transmembrane domain. Expression of DLL3 is highest in fetal brain. It plays a key role in somitogenesis within the Paraxial mesoderm.

Clinical significance 

Mutations in this gene cause the autosomal recessive genetic disorder Jarcho-Levin syndrome. Expression of the gene occurs in Neuroendocrine tumors, which has been targeted as a potential pathway for treatment.

An experimental drug, rovalpituzumab tesirine, targets DLL3 as a possible treatment for lung cancer.

References

External links
  GeneReviews/NIH/NCBI/UW entry on Spondylocostal Dysostosis, Autosomal Recessive

Further reading